Shir Berenj (Persian: شیر برنج; also transliterated as "Sheer Berenj" or "Sheer Berinj") or Fereni, is a rice pudding flavored with rose water, spices such as cinnamon or cardamom and often containing almonds. It is common to many countries contiguous with ancient Persia or in the Greater Iran region, including Afghanistan, Iran, and Azerbaijan. It may be served warm or chilled as a dessert.

References

See also
 List of almond dishes

Rice pudding
Almond dishes
Afghan desserts

Pakistani cuisine
Sindhi cuisine
Pashtun cuisine
Baloch culture